Productive forces, productive powers, or forces of production (German: Produktivkräfte) is a central idea in Marxism and historical materialism.

In Karl Marx and Friedrich Engels' own critique of political economy, it refers to the combination of the means of labor (tools, machinery, land, infrastructure, and so on) with human labour power.  Marx and Engels probably derived the concept from Adam Smith's reference to the "productive powers of labour" (see e.g. chapter 8 of The Wealth of Nations (1776)), although the German political economist Friedrich List also mentions the concept of "productive powers" in The National System of Political Economy (1841).

All those forces which are applied by people in the production process (body and brain, tools and techniques, materials, resources, quality of workers' cooperation, and equipment) are encompassed by this concept, including those management and engineering functions technically indispensable for production (as contrasted with social control functions). Human knowledge can also be a productive force.

Together with the social and technical relations of production, the productive forces constitute a historically specific mode of production.

Labor 
Karl Marx emphasized that with few exceptions means of labour are not a productive force unless they are actually operated, maintained and conserved by living human labour. Without applying living human labour, their physical condition and value would deteriorate, depreciate, or be destroyed (an example would be a ghost town or capital depreciation due to strike action).

Capital itself, being one of the factors of production, comes to be viewed in capitalist society as a productive force in its own right, independent from labour, a subject with "a life of its own". Indeed, Marx sees the essence of what he calls "the capital relation" as being summarised by the circumstance that "capital buys labour", i.e. the power of property ownership to command human energy and labour-time, and thus of inanimate "things" to exert an autonomous power over people. What disappears from view is that the power of capital depends in the last instance on human cooperation.

The productive power of cooperation comes to be viewed as the productive power of capital, because it is capital which forcibly organises people, rather than people organising capital. Marx regarded this as a supreme reification.

Unlike British classical economics, Marxian economics classifies financial capital as being an element of the relations of production, rather than the factors or forces of production ("not a thing, but a social relation between persons, established by the instrumentality of things").

Destructive forces 

Marx and Engels did not believe that human history featured a continuous growth of the productive forces. Rather, the development of the productive forces was characterised by social conflicts. Some productive forces destroyed other productive forces, sometimes productive techniques were lost or destroyed, and sometimes productive forces could be turned into destructive forces:

Marxist–Leninist definition in the Soviet Union 
The Institute of Economics of the Academy of Sciences of the U.S.S.R., textbook (1957, p xiv) says that "[t]he productive forces reflect the relationship of people to the objects and forces of nature used for the production of material wealth." (italics added) While productive forces are a human activity, the concept of productive forces includes the concept that technology mediates the human-nature relationship. Productive forces do not include the subject of labor (the raw materials or materials from nature being worked on). Productive forces are not the same thing as the means of production. Marx identified three components of production: human labor, subject of labor, and means of labor (1967, p 174). Productive forces are the union of human labor and the means of labor; means of production are the union of the subject of labor and the means of labor. (Institute of Economics of the Academy of Sciences of the U.S.S.R., 1957, p xiii).

On the other hand, The Great Soviet Encyclopedia (1969–1978) states:

According to this, productive forces have such structure:
 People (human labour power)
 Means (the material elements of the productive forces)
 Means of production
 Means of labour
 Instruments of labour
 Objects of labour (also known as Subject of labour)
 Means of consumption

Marxism in USSR served as core philosophical paradigm or platform, and had been developing as a science. So different views, hypotheses and approaches were widely discussed, tested and refined with time.

Determinism 
See article: Theory of productive forces

Reification of technology 
Other interpretations, sometimes influenced by postmodernism and the concept of commodity fetishism have by contrast emphasized the reification of the powers of technology, said to occur by the separation of technique from the producers, and by falsely imputing human powers to technology as autonomous force, the effect being a perspective of inevitable and unstoppable technological progress operating beyond any human control, and impervious to human choices.

In turn, this is said to have the effect of naturalising and legitimating social arrangements produced by people, by asserting that they are technically inevitable. The error here seems to be that social relations between people are confused and conflated with technical relations between people and things, and object relations between things; but this error is said to be a spontaneous result of the operation of a universal market and the process of commercialization.

Productivity 
Marx's concept of productive forces also has some relevance for discussions in economics about the meaning and measurement of productivity.

Modern economics theorises productivity in terms of the marginal product of the factors of production. Marx theorises productivity within the capitalist mode of production in terms of the social and technical relations of production, with the concept of the organic composition of capital and the value product. He suggests there is no completely neutral view of productivity possible; how productivity is defined depends on the values and interests people have. Thus, different social classes have different notions of productivity reflecting their own station in life, and giving rise to different notions of productive and unproductive labour.

Critique of technology 
In the Romantic or ecological critique of technology, technical progress boosting productivity often does not mean human progress at all. The design of production technologies may not be suited to human needs or human health, or technologies may be used in ways which do more harm than good. In that case, productive forces are transformed into destructive forces.

Sometimes this view leads to cultural pessimism or a theory of "Small is beautiful" as proposed by E. F. Schumacher. Ideas about alternative technology are also proposed. All of this suggests that the technologies we have, are only options which have been chosen from different technical possibilities existing at the time, and that the same technologies can be used for good or for ill, in different contexts.

A technology may be chosen because it is profitable, and once adopted on a mass scale, it may be difficult to create alternatives to it, particularly because it becomes integrated with other technologies and a whole "life style" (e.g. petrol-fueled cars). Yet that may not mean that the technology is ultimately desirable for human life on earth.

Productive force determinism is then criticised on the ground that whatever technologies are adopted, these are the result of human choices between technical alternatives, influenced by the human interests and stakes existing at the time. What may be presented as a pre-determined "technical necessity" may in reality have more to do with considerations of political, sociological, or economic power.

Advocates of technological progress however argue that even if admittedly "progress may have its price", without technical innovation there would be no progress at all; the same people who criticize technology also depend on it for their everyday existence.

References 
 Karl Marx, The Poverty of Philosophy
 Karl Marx, The German Ideology
 Karl Marx, "The Trinity Formula", chapter 48 in volume 3 of Marx's Capital.
 Josef V. Stalin, Dialectical and Historical Materialism.
 G. A. Cohen, Karl Marx's Theory of History: A Defence.
 Perry Anderson, Arguments within English Marxism.
 Isaac I. Rubin, Essays on Marx's Theory of value.
 Bertell Ollman, Alienation: Marx's Conception of Man in Capitalist Society.
 Kostas Axelos, Alienation, Praxis and Techne in the Thought of Karl Marx.
 Peter L. Berger, Pyramids of Sacrifice.
 John Kenneth Galbraith, The New Industrial State.
 Jacques Ellul, The Technological Society.
 Leo Kofler, Technologische Rationalität im Spätkapitalismus.
 Anwar Shaikh, "Laws of Production and Laws of Algebra: The Humbug Production Function", in The Review of Economics and Statistics, Volume 56(1), February 1974, pp. 115–120.
 Francisco Louça and Christopher Freeman, As Time Goes By; From the Industrial Revolutions to the Information Revolution.
 David F. Noble, Progress Without People: In Defense of Luddism
 Institute of Economics of the Academy of Sciences of the U.S.S.R. (1957). Political Economy: A Textbook. London: Lawrence and Wishart.
 Marx, Karl (1867 | 1967). Capital Vol. I. New York: International Publishers.
 Specific

External links 

Marxist theory
Political theories
Communist theory

ru:Марксистская политическая экономия#Производительные силы